Kusturica is a surname. Notable people with this surname include:

 Edis Kusturica (born 1953), Bosnian entrepreneur, lawyer and former 37th president of the assembly of FK Sarajevo
 Emir Kusturica (born 1954), Serbian filmmaker, actor and musician
 Nina Kusturica (born 1975), Bosnian-Herzegovinian-born, Austrian film director, film editor and film producer

Serbian surnames
Bosnian surnames